Frode Sørensen (8 February 1912 – 1 August 1980) was a Danish cyclist who competed in the 1932 Summer Olympics and in the 1936 Summer Olympics. He won a silver medal in the team road race event in 1932.

References

1912 births
1980 deaths
Danish male cyclists
Olympic cyclists of Denmark
Cyclists at the 1932 Summer Olympics
Cyclists at the 1936 Summer Olympics
Olympic silver medalists for Denmark
Olympic medalists in cycling
Cyclists from Copenhagen
Medalists at the 1932 Summer Olympics